Kureh Daraq (also Romanized as Kūreh Daraq; also known as Kūreh Dazaq) is a village in Goyjah Bel Rural District, in the Central District of Ahar County, East Azerbaijan Province, Iran. At the 2006 census, its population was 111, in 23 families.

References 

Populated places in Ahar County